The city of Brighton and Hove, on the south coast of England, has more than 100  extant churches and other places of worship, which serve a variety of Christian denominations and other religions.  More than 50  former religious buildings, although still in existence, are no longer used for their original purpose.

The history of the area now covered by Brighton and Hove spans nearly 1000 years, although the city has only existed in its present form since 2000.  The small settlement of Bristelmestune, mentioned in the Domesday Book, developed into a locally important fishing village, and was saved from its 18th-century decline by the patronage of the Prince Regent and British high society.  Hove, to the west, had modest origins; rapid growth in the 19th century caused it to merge with Brighton, although it has always tried to maintain its separate identity.  During the 20th century, both boroughs expanded by absorbing surrounding villages such as Patcham, Hangleton, West Blatchington and Ovingdean, each of which had an ancient church at their centre.  New housing estates such as Mile Oak, Moulsecoomb and Saltdean were built on land acquired by the boroughs.

Apart from the ancient parish churches of Brighton (St Nicholas) and Hove (St Andrew's), and those of the nearby villages that are now part of the city, few places of worship existed until the 19th century.  During that century, however—and especially in the Victorian era—England experienced a surge in church-building, which left its mark on both Brighton and Hove.  Reverend Henry Michell Wagner (Vicar of Brighton between 1824 and 1870) and his son Reverend Arthur Wagner founded and funded a succession of Anglican churches for the benefit of Brighton's rapidly growing population, while enduring controversy and conflict over their political and religious ideals; many churches were founded in Hove; and Roman Catholic, Baptist, Unitarian, Jewish and other places of worship became established for the first time.  Although overcapacity and increasing maintenance costs have led to some closures and demolitions, new churches continued to be established throughout the 20th century on the new housing estates.

Religious affiliation in Brighton and Hove
As of the 2001 United Kingdom Census, 247,817 people lived in Brighton and Hove.  Of these, 59.1% were Christian, 1.47% were Muslim, 1.36% were Jewish, 0.7% were Buddhist, 0.52% were Hindu, 0.1% were Sikh, 0.85% were affiliated with another religion, 27.02% followed no religion and 8.88% did not state their religion.  Some of these proportions are significantly different from those of England as a whole. Judaism and Buddhism have a much greater following: 0.52% of people in England are Jewish and 0.28% are Buddhist.  Christianity is much less widespread in the city than in the country overall, in which 71.74% people identify themselves as Christian.  The proportion of people with no religious affiliation is nearly twice as high as that of England as a whole (14.59%).

Administration
All Anglican churches in the city are administered by the Diocese of Chichester, and (at the level below this) by the Archdeaconry of Chichester, one of three archdeaconries in the diocese.  The Rural Deanery of Brighton is one of five deaneries under the archdeaconry.  It covers 28 extant churches and 9 that are no longer used for worship.  One of its churches, St Laurence at Falmer, is in the neighbouring district of Lewes.  The Rural Deanery of Hove, also part of the Archdeaconry of Chichester, has 28 churches, of which five are closed; eight are in the Adur district of West Sussex, as the deanery covers Kingston Buci, Southwick and Shoreham-by-Sea as well as Hove and Portslade.

The 11 Roman Catholic churches in the city are in Brighton and Hove Deanery, one of thirteen deaneries in the Diocese of Arundel and Brighton.  The deanery has 13 churches, but those in Peacehaven and Southwick are outside the city boundaries, in Lewes District and Adur District respectively.  The parish of Southwick's church, St Theresa of Lisieux, has covered the Portslade area of Brighton and Hove since 1992, when the Church of Our Lady Star of the Sea and St Denis in Portslade was declared redundant and demolished after 80 years.

Of the ten Baptist churches in Brighton and Hove, six are part of the Mid Sussex Network of the South Eastern Baptist Association, one of nine divisions of the Baptist Union of Great Britain: the Holland Road and New Life Christian churches in Hove, the Florence Road and Gloucester Place churches in Brighton (now linked as a single entity called "One Church Brighton"), the Oasis Christian Fellowship Church in Hangleton and the church in Portslade.  Also in this network is a Baptist community in Woodingdean that does not have its own premises and worships in a school.  The Ebenezer Reformed Baptist Church is part of GraceNet UK, an association of Reformed Evangelical Christian churches and organisations, as was Montpelier Place Baptist Church (closed in 2012 and subsequently demolished).  Galeed Strict Baptist Chapel is affiliated with the Gospel Standard Baptist movement.

In 1972, the Congregational Church and the Presbyterian Church of England merged to form the United Reformed Church.  All United Reformed churches in the city are part of the Southern Synod, one of 13 synods within the Church. The city's five Methodist churches are in the Brighton and Hove Methodist Circuit.

Buildings with listed status
In England, a building or structure is defined as "listed" when it is placed on a statutory register of buildings of "special architectural or historic interest" by the Secretary of State for Culture, Media and Sport, a Government department, in accordance with the Planning (Listed Buildings and Conservation Areas) Act 1990.  English Heritage, a non-departmental public body, acts as an agency of this department to administer the process.  There are three grades of listing status. Grade I, the highest, is defined as being of "exceptional interest"; Grade II* is used for "particularly important buildings of more than special interest"; and Grade II, the lowest, is used for "nationally important" buildings of "special interest".

As of February 2001, there were 24 Grade I-listed buildings, 70 Grade II*-listed buildings and 1,124 Grade II-listed buildings in Brighton and Hove.  Five of the Grade I-listed buildings are churches; all are Anglican.  There are 18 Grade II*-listed places of worship: 15 Anglican churches, two Roman Catholic churches and a synagogue.  Twenty-seven current and former places of worship have Grade II status.

In February 2015, Brighton and Hove City Council adopted a new draft "local list of heritage assets".  Hundreds of buildings and structures in the city were assessed against criteria which covered their "local historic, architectural, design and townscape value", and those meeting the criteria were designated as locally listed buildings (subject to final approval by the council's Economic Development and Culture Committee later in 2015).  Buildings on the draft list include nearly 30 current and former places of worship.

Current places of worship

Former places of worship

See also
Buildings and architecture of Brighton and Hove
List of demolished places of worship in Brighton and Hove

References

Notes

Bibliography

 
Brighton
Brighton
Places of worship
Lists of buildings and structures in East Sussex